Egypt Taylor is an American entrepreneur, producer, and recognizable artist in the hip-hop community. Born in Dallas, Texas, United States, and a native to Philadelphia, Egypt has been referred to as a "veteran freshman" because of his young start and early approval in the music industry. Egypt's contribution to modern hip-hop has caused an increase in publicity and his personal life. Egypt has worked with artists such as Kendrick Lamar, Kanye West, APEX Predator, and other well known producers such as Metro Boomin and Andy Ha. Egypt was also a summiter at the 2015 Forbes 30 Under 30 Summit in Philadelphia.

His most recent work on "Champion" and "The Prodigies" has given him a foundation to broadcast his work. Egypt was also featured in "Gucci, Louis" with Lil 100 of SODMG. His debut song "Champion" along with various production credits and artist co-signs has led to his recent increase in exposure. A staple tradition at Egypt's shows and concerts is throwing Capri Suns to his audience to encourage fan engagement.

References

People from Dallas
Living people
American hip hop musicians
Year of birth missing (living people)